Komarolu is a Mandal in Prakasam district of the Indian state of Andhra Pradesh. It is the mandal headquarters of komarolumandal in Markapur revenue division.

Geography 
It has an average elevation of 249 metres (820 feet).

Komarolu is a mandal with several villages named as Taticherla, Akkapalle, Pottipalle, Nallaguntla etc.

Demographics
According to the Indian census, 2011, the demographic details of Komarolu mandal is as follows:
 Total Population: 	40,331	in 9,403 Households. 
 Male Population: 	20,892	and Female Population: 	19,439		
 Children Under 6-years of age: 	5,034	Boys - 	2,599	and Girls -	2,435)
 Total Literates: 	20,863	

Komarolu mandal had a population of 10746 in 2011.

References 

Villages in Prakasam district
Mandal headquarters in Prakasam district